The Willoughby Gregory House (also known as Krausland) is a historic home in Quincy, Florida. It is located near the junction of Highway 274 and Krausland Road. On December 16, 1983, it was added to the U.S. National Register of Historic Places.

References

External links

 Gadsden County listings at National Register of Historic Places
 Florida's Office of Cultural and Historical Programs
 Gadsden County listings
 Gregory House (Krausland)

Houses in Gadsden County, Florida
Houses on the National Register of Historic Places in Florida
National Register of Historic Places in Gadsden County, Florida
Houses completed in 1843